Étienne, baron Radet (1762, Stenay, Meuse - 1825, Varennes) was a French general of the French Revolutionary Wars and Napoleonic Wars. He is notable as the leader of the troops Napoleon sent to abduct Pius VII.

Life
Radet was born at Stenay in 1762. 

He joined the Régiment de La Sarre as a soldier on 4 April 1780. He was promoted to corporal on 20 March 1781, and sergeant on 26 April 1782. Dismissed on 12 October 1786, he became a constabulary's rider on 30 November of the same year.

He was appointed as a general of brigade in 1800 by Napoleon Bonaparte, who gave him the chief command of all the Gendarmerie (armed police.) In 1809 he was ordered to Rome. In July of that year he arrested the Pope Pius VII in his palace and conducted him to Florence. He received the title of baron (1809), and became a general of division in 1813.

In June 1815 he was appointed Grand Provost of the Gendarmerie (i.e. military police) accompanying the French army in Belgium during the Waterloo Campaign. He was present at Ligny and at the Battle of Waterloo itself, where in the evening of 18 June he was wounded. During the retreat he rode, while bleeding, in the company of Napoleon as far as Charleroi, before proceeding to Beaumont, where he attempted to rally those fleeing and stem the rout. At Maubeuge and Avesnes on the 19th he issued orders to the gendarmes to start arresting the fugitives in an attempt to reconstitute the army and restore discipline. At Laon on 20 June he again met the Emperor, who soon proceeded to Paris, where Radet soon followed, having been granted leave to rest and heal his wounds. While Radet was in Paris Napoleon abdicated for the second time.

Upon the return of the Bourbons he was imprisoned in the citadel at Besançon on 28 June 1816, but on 24 December 1818 a royal decision granted him remission on the rest of his sentence on 24 December 1818. Allowed to retire on 1 December 1819, he died at Varennes on 27 September 1825.

Fiction
In 1981 he was depicted by French actor Jacques Herlin in the Italian movie Il Marchese del Grillo.

Notes

Sources
 Radet, E., Mémoires du général Radet (ed. A. Combier), St. Cloud: 1892.

1762 births
1825 deaths
People from Meuse (department)
French Republican military leaders of the French Revolutionary Wars
French commanders of the Napoleonic Wars